Shroud of Madness is a novel by Carl Sargent and Marc Gascoigne published by FASA in 1995.

Plot summary
Shroud of Madness is an Earthdawn novel set in the Theran-controlled city of Vivane, and details a series of grisly murders and apparent suicides that rock the major noble houses.

Reception
Andy Butcher reviewed Shroud of Madness for Arcane magazine, rating it a 6 out of 10 overall. Butcher comments that "It's not required reading, by any means, but anyone planning to run adventures in and around the city will find lots of useful background detail for their games."

References

1995 novels
Earthdawn
Novels based on role-playing games